Kargbo is a surname. Notable people with the surname include:

Abu-Bakarr Kargbo (born 1992), Sierra Leonean football player
Augustus Kargbo (born 1999), Sierra Leonean football player
Edward Kargbo (born 1963), Sierra Leonean politician
Ibrahim Ben Kargbo (born 1944), Sierra Leonean journalist and politician
Ibrahim Kargbo (born 1982), Sierra Leonean football player
Ibrahim Kargbo Jr. (born 2000), Sierra Leonean football player
Karefa Kargbo, Sierra Leonean politician
Michaela Kargbo (born 1991), Sierra Leonean sprinter
Momodu Kargbo, Sierra Leonean politician and economist
Saidu Kargbo (born 1982), Sierra Leone boxer
Samuel Kargbo (born 1974), Gambian football player
Sidney Kargbo (born 1986), Sierra Leonean football player